Kenn or KENN may refer to:

Places
Kenn, Devon, a village in England
Kenn, Somerset, a village in England
Kenn, Germany, a place in Rhineland-Palatinate, Germany

Other uses
Kenn (Japanese actor)
KENN (AM), American radio station

See also
Kenne
Kann (disambiguation)